Potato Hole is a 2009 album by Booker T. Jones, recorded with Drive-By Truckers as the backing band and guitar accompaniment by Neil Young.

On January 31, 2010, Potato Hole won the Best Pop Instrumental Album award at the 52nd Annual Grammy Awards. The track "Warped Sister" was also nominated, for Best Rock Instrumental Performance, but that award went to Jeff Beck for "A Day in The Life".

Track listing
All tracks written by Booker T. Jones; except as noted.

 "Pound It Out" – 4:18
 "She Breaks" – 4:22
 "Hey Ya!" (André 3000) – 3:53
 "Native New Yorker" – 3:47
 "Nan" – 2:08
 "Warped Sister" – 4:47
 "Get Behind the Mule" (Tom Waits, Kathleen Brennan) – 4:10
 "Reunion Time" – 3:49
 "Potato Hole" – 6:50
 "Space City" (Mike Cooley, Brad Morgan, Jason Isbell, Patterson Hood, Shonna Tucker) – 5:38

Personnel
 Booker T. – organ, guitars (1, 5, 8)
 Mike Cooley – guitars
 Patterson Hood – guitars
 John Neff – guitars, pedal steel guitar
 Neil Young – guitars
 Shonna Tucker – bass
 Brad Morgan – drums
 Lucy Castro – percussion

Technical
Andy Kaulkin – executive producer
Doug Boehm – engineer
Jason Thrasher – photography

References 

2009 albums
Booker T. Jones albums
Anti- (record label) albums
Albums produced by Rob Schnapf
Albums produced by Booker T. Jones
Grammy Award for Best Contemporary Instrumental Album
Neil Young